Dimetra  is a plant genus in the family Oleaceae. It contains the single species Dimetra craibiana, native to Thailand and Laos. The genus and species were described  in 1938 by the Irish botanist Arthur Francis George Kerr.

References

Myxopyreae
Flora of Thailand
Flora of Laos
Plants described in 1938